Energy & Environmental Science is a monthly peer-reviewed scientific journal publishing original (primary) research and review articles. The journal covers work of an interdisciplinary nature in the biochemical and biophysical sciences and chemical and mechanical engineering disciplines. It covers energy area. Energy & Environmental Science is published by the Royal Society of Chemistry and the editor-in-chief is Joseph Hupp (Northwestern University, USA).

According to the Journal Citation Reports, the journal has a 2017 impact factor of 30.067, ranking it 4th out of 163 journals in the category "Chemistry, Multidisciplinary", first out of 88 journals in the category "Energy & Fuels", first out of 135 journals in the category "Engineering, Chemical", and first among 225 journals in the category "Environmental Sciences".

Article types
Energy & Environmental Science publishes the following types of articles: Research Papers (original scientific work); Review Articles, Perspectives, and Minireviews (feature review-type articles of broad interest); Communications (original scientific work of an urgent nature), Opinions (personal, often speculative, viewpoints or hypotheses on a current topic), and Analysis Articles (in-depth examination of energy and environmental technologies, strategies, policies, and general conceptual frameworks of general interest).

Abstracting and indexing
According to the Thomson Reuters Master Journal List and CASSI, this journal is indexed by the following services:
Science Citation Index Expanded
Current Contents/ Agriculture, Biology & Environmental Sciences
Current Contents/ Physical, Chemical & Earth Sciences
Current Contents/ Engineering, Computing & Technology
Chemical Abstracts Service - CASSI

References

External links

Further reading
 Energy & Environmental Science
 2021 ESS PI Meeting Research Summary
 CO2-Ausstoß für Fahrzeuge online berechnen (in German)
 Advancing understanding of Earth and environmental systems from the molecular to the global scale

Chemistry journals
Energy and fuel journals
Monthly journals
Publications established in 2008
Royal Society of Chemistry academic journals
Environmental science journals
English-language journals